Innovative companies rating «TechUspech» — a Russian economic rating of innovative companies, founded by Russian Venture Company, Foundation for Assistance to Small Innovative Enterprises in Science and Technology, the Foundation for infrastructure and educational programs RUSNANO and OJSC Russian Bank for Small and Medium Enterprises (SME Bank). Association of Innovative Regions of Russia is an operator of the rating.

Criteria 
The list of cretaria:
 A company is originated and developed in Russia’s recent history (i.e., not 1987)
 A business is built and developed on the basis of the development and commercialization of high-tech products
 Annual turnover from the sale of its own high-tech products is 100 million rubles. and more
 A company shows a strong positive trend of sales
 A company sales its own high-tech products in many regions of Russia, and perhaps begins to expand to foreign markets

Most innovative companies in 2012 year 
30 Most innovative companies in Russia

10 Most innovative companies in Russia

 IT group of companies
 Unihimtek Group
 CFT Group
 Diakont
 Interskol
 NEARMEDIC PLUS
 Novomet-Perm
 Ramek
 Svemel
 Elar
 ER-Telecom

References 

Rating systems
Economy of Russia